Miharu (written: 三晴) is a feminine Japanese given name. Notable people with the name include:

, Japanese ice hockey player
 Miharu Arisawa, member of the band BeForU
 Miharu Koshi, Japanese popular musician
 Miharu Kobayashi, Japanese professional footballer
, Japanese professional tennis player

Fictional characters 
 Miharu Amakase, a character from the Da Capo visual novel/manga/anime
 Miharu Fuyuki, a character from the visual novel Welcome to Pia Carrot
 Miharu Hirano, a character in the Tekken games
 Miharu Mihar, a character in the anime/manga Aki Sora
 Miharu Mikuni, a character in the anime/manga KissxSis
 Miharu Ogawa, a character in the web comic Red String
 Miharu Ohzora, a character in the anime/manga Stratos 4 
 Miharu Rokujou, a character in the anime/manga Nabari no Ou
 Miharu Sena Kanaka, a character in the anime/manga "Girls Bravo"
 Miharu Shimizu, a character in the anime/manga Baka to Test to Shōkanjū
 Miharu Shirumaku, a character in the anime/manga Speed Grapher
 Miharu Takeshita, a character in the anime/manga B Gata H Kei

Japanese feminine given names